Samuel Logan Edwards (born 18 November 1968) is a New Zealand former rugby league footballer.

Domestic career
Edwards played for the dominating Canterbury provincial side of the early 1990s alongside such talent as Quentin Pongia, Mike Dorreen, Whetu Taewa and coach Frank Endacott. This side continued its success as the Canterbury Cardinals in the 1994 Lion Red Cup. In 1993 he was selected for the New Zealand national rugby league team tour of Britain and France.

Edwards spent the New Zealand off-season in England, playing for the Rochdale Hornets from 1988/89 to 1989/90 then Swinton from 1989/90 to 1990/91. He then played for the Oldham Bears (Heritage № 982) during the 1991/92 season.

Auckland Warriors
In 1995 he joined the new Auckland Warriors franchise in the Australian Rugby League. He played fourteen matches for the new club but was not re-signed for 1996. He also forced his way back into the Kiwis in 1995, being an unused substitution in the test against France and playing against Australia. Injury however stopped him making the 1995 Rugby League World Cup squad.

He was to join the Hunter Mariners in 1996 however a court ruling during the Super League war stopped the launch of the club until 1997.

Return to Canterbury
He currently resides in Christchurch and in 2005 he was named in the Canterbury Dream Team. In 2007 he was to coach the Canterbury under-18 side alongside Mike Doreen before the competition was cancelled by the New Zealand Rugby League. In 2009 he is the Canterbury Bulls under 18 assistant coach, under Doreen.

Notes

External links
 Statistics at www.orl-heritagetrust.org.uk

1968 births
Living people
Canterbury rugby league team players
Hunter Mariners players
Marist-Western Suburbs players
New Zealand Māori rugby league players
New Zealand national rugby league team players
New Zealand rugby league players
New Zealand expatriate sportspeople in England
New Zealand Warriors players
Oldham R.L.F.C. players
Riccarton Knights players
Rochdale Hornets players
Swinton Lions players
Rugby league second-rows